Richard Huddleston may refer to:

 Richard Huddleston (monk) (1583–1655)
 Richard Huddleston (MP) (1535–1589)